The Silesius Poetry Award (Polish: Wrocławska Nagroda Poetycka Silesius) is an annual Polish literary prize presented by the city of Wrocław, Lower Silesia.

History
The award was established in 2008 and is presented during the Port Literacki Wrocław Festival. It takes its name from a prominent Silesian Baroque poet Angelus Silesius (1624–1677). The award was created on the initiative of Jarosław Broda, head of the Wroclaw Department of Culture, and is funded by the city of Wrocław. It is awarded in three major categories: lifetime achievement, best debut and book of the year and the laureates receive cash prizes of PLN 100,000 (c.$25,000), PLN 50,000 and PLN 20,000 respectively. They are also presented with a statuette designed by a Polish sculptor Michał Staszczak.

Laureates 

2020
Book of the Year: Konrad Góra (for Kalendarz Majów) ("The Maya Calendar")
Best Debut: Jakub Pszoniak (for Chyba na pewno) 
Lifetime achievement Award: Eugeniusz Tkaczyszyn-Dycki

2019
Book of the Year: Adam Kaczanowski (for Cele)
Best Debut: Maciej Bobula (for Wsie, animalia, miscellanea)
Lifetime Achievement Award: Ewa Lipska

2018
 Book of the Year: Jerzy Jarniewicz (for Puste noce) ("Empty Nights")
 Best Debut: Agata Jabłońska (for Raport wojenny) ("The War Report")
 Lifetime Achievement Award: Bohdan Zadura

2017
 Book of the Year: Jacek Podsiadło (for Włos Bregueta) ("Breguet's Hair")
 Best Debut: Radosław Jurczak (for Pamięć zewnętrzna)
 Lifetime Achievement Award: Andrzej Sosnowski

2016
 Book of the Year: Barbara Klicka (for Nice)
 Best Debut: Aldona Kopkiewicz (for Sierpień) ("August")
 Lifetime Achievement Award: Julian Kornhauser

2015
 Book of the Year: Marcin Sendecki (for Przedmiar robót)
 Best Debut: Michał Książek (for Nauka o ptakach)
 Lifetime Achievement Award: Jacek Podsiadło

2014
 Book of the Year: Mariusz Grzebalski (for W innych okolicznościach) ("In Other Circumstances")
 Best Debut: Martyna Buliżańska (for Moja jest ta ziemia) ("This Land is Mine")
 Lifetime Achievement Award: Darek Foks

2013
 Book of the Year: Marcin Baran (for Niemal całkowita utrata płynności) ("A Near Total Loss of Fluency")
 Best Debut: Ilona Witkowska (for Splendida realta)
 Lifetime Achievement Award: Krystyna Miłobędzka

2012
 Book of the Year: Eugeniusz Tkaczyszyn-Dycki (for Imię i znamię) ("The Name and the Mark")
 Best Debut: Tomasz Bąk (for Kanada) ("Canada")
 Lifetime Achievement Award: Marcin Świetlicki

2011
 Book of the Year: Bohdan Zadura (for Nocne życie) ("Night Life")
 Best Debut: Kira Pietrek (for Język korzyści)
 Lifetime Achievement Award: Urszula Kozioł

2010
 Book of the Year: Piotr Matywiecki (for Powietrze i czerń) ("Air and Blackness")
 Best Debut: Jakobe Mansztajn (for Wiedeński high life) ("The Vienna High Life")
 Lifetime Achievement Award: Piotr Sommer

2009
 Book of the Year: Krystyna Miłobędzka (for Gubione)
 Best Debut: Dariusz Basiński (for Motor kupił Duszan)
 Lifetime Achievement Award: Stanisław Barańczak

2008
 Book of the Year: Andrzej Sosnowski (for Po tęczy) ("After the Rainbow")
 Best Debut: Julia Szychowiak (for Po sobie)
 Lifetime Achievement Award: Tadeusz Różewicz

See also
Nike Award
Angelus Award
Polish literature

References 

First book awards
Polish literary awards
Awards established in 2008
2008 establishments in Poland
Literary awards honoring lifetime achievement